NA-142 may refer to:
 NA-142 (Okara-II), a constituency for the National Assembly of Pakistan
 NA-142 (Kasur-V), a former constituency for the National Assembly of Pakistan

National Assembly Constituencies of Pakistan